Thomas Callaway is an American retired actor, who last performed on screen in 1995. He was also credited as Tom Callaway. He has since become a successful interior designer in the Greater Los Angeles Area.

Education
He graduated from Lawrence University, Appleton, Wisconsin with a bachelor's degree in fine art and architecture. As an undergraduate he was active in campus theatrical productions.

Career

While still working as an actor, he opened a residential and interior design business in 1989 in California, Thomas Callaway and Associates. He created a furniture line in 1990.

Selected filmography
 Falcon Crest as Dr. Otto Foster
 V: The Series as Klaus
 Hart to Hart (episode: "Death Set") as David Craddock
 Murder, She Wrote (episode: "Murder by Twos") as Sam Bryce
 Picket Fences (episode: "The Autumn of Rome") as Paulie Thigpen
 Murphy Brown (episode: "Murphy Buys the Farm") as Mr. Abernathy
 L.A. Law (episode: "The Gods Must Be Lawyers") as Owen Baldwin
 Who's the Boss? (episode: "Your Grandmother's a Bimbo") as Jake Ashby 
 Cheers (episode: "Dark Imaginings") as Jack Turner
 Walt Disney's Wonderful World of Color (episode: "The Absent-Minded Professor") as Prof. Donald 
 Two Idiots in Hollywood as T. Barry Armstrong
 Young Guns as Texas Joe Grant 
 Punky Brewster (episode: "No No, We Won't Go") as Benjamin J. Kramer
 The Alamo: Thirteen Days to Glory (TV Movie) as Col. James W. Fannin
 Cowboy Joe (TV Movie) as "Cowboy Joe Cutler"
 Designing Women (episode: "New Year's Daze") as Shadow
 Washingtoon as Bob Forehead
 WKRP in Cincinnati, ("Jennifer Falls in Love". Season 2, Episode 27, October 29, 1979) as Steel Hawthorne
 M*A*S*H (episode: "Run for the Money") as Captain Sweeney
 Laverne & Shirley (episode:  "Watch the Fur Fly" January 19, 1982) as Harold
 The Jeffersons (episodes "Laundry Is a Tough Town" parts 1 & 2) as Steve Winslow.

References

External links
 Thomas Callaway Interior Design official website; accessed November 24, 2014.
 Profile, hollywoodreporter.com; accessed November 24, 2014. 
 

Living people
Place of birth missing (living people)
Year of birth missing (living people)
Businesspeople from California
People from Greater Los Angeles
American male film actors
American male television actors
American interior designers
20th-century American male actors